Polina Vladimirovna Gelman (24 October 191925 November 2005) was a flight navigator in the all-female 46th Guards Night Bomber Aviation Regiment who was awarded the title Hero of the Soviet Union in 1946 for having totaled 857 sorties during World War II.

Early life
Born to a working-class Jewish family from the Ukrainian city of Berdychiv in 1919, after the death of her father she lived in Gomel, Belarus with her mother. In 1938 she completed her tenth grade of school and graduated from the Gomel glider school. Admitted to the history department of Moscow State University, she attended some classes at the school before the war cut short her schooling.

World War II 
A history major at MSU at the time of the German invasion of the Soviet Union, Gelman was recruited by Marina Raskova to join the newly formed women's aviation group. Following training at Engels Military Aviation School, she was deployed to the Southern Front in May 1942 with the women's 588th Night Bomber Regiment, later redesignated as the 46th Taman Guards Night Bomber Aviation Regiment in 1943. Starting in September 1943, she began flying as navigator for Raisa Aronova, who also went on to become a Hero of the Soviet Union. By the end of the war she reached the rank of senior lieutenant and totaled 857 combat sorties, dropping 113 tonnes of bombs, having participated in bombing campaigns in the North Caucasus, Stavropol, Kuban, Novorossiysk, Crimea, Kuban, Kerch, Belorussia, Poland, and Germany across the Southern, Transcaucasus, North Caucasus, 4th Ukrainian, and 2nd Belarusian fronts. The day after the end of the war she was nominated for the title Hero of the Soviet Union, which was awarded to her over a year later on 15 May 1946.

Postwar 
Continuing her career as a professional military officer, she was sent for instruction as a military translator, graduating from the Military Institute of Foreign Languages in 1951.

Gelman settled in Moscow following her retirement from active service as a major in 1957, and worked at the Institute of Social Sciences teaching political economy as a college instructor until retiring in 1990. She attained the rank of lieutenant colonel in the reserves. A member of the Communist Party of the Soviet Union since 1942, she was sent as an advisor and translator to Cuba. She died in Moscow on 25 November 2005 and was buried in the Novodevichy Cemetery.

Honours and awards
 Hero of the Soviet Union (15 May 1946)
 Order of Lenin (15 May 1946)
 Two Orders of the Red Banner (25 October 1943 and 22 May 1945)
 Two Orders of the Patriotic War 1st class (26 April 1944 and 11 March 1985)
 Two Orders of the Red Star (9 September 1945 and 30 December 1956)
 Medal "For Battle Merit" (19 November 1951)
 campaign and jubilee medals

See also

 46th Guards Night Bomber Regiment
 List of female Heroes of the Soviet Union
 List of Jewish Heroes of the Soviet Union
 Polikarpov Po-2

References

Bibliography 
 
 

1919 births
2005 deaths
People from Berdychiv
Communist Party of the Soviet Union members
Heroes of the Soviet Union
Soviet Jews
Ukrainian Jews
Soviet Jews in the military
Soviet non-fiction writers
Ukrainian women in World War II
Women air force personnel of the Soviet Union
Soviet women in World War II
Soviet women writers
20th-century Ukrainian women writers
Burials at Novodevichy Cemetery
Recipients of the Order of the Red Banner
Flight navigators
Russian women aviators
20th-century non-fiction writers